The Winterburn Group is a stratigraphical unit of Frasnian age in the Western Canadian Sedimentary Basin. 

It takes the name from Winterburn area located west of Edmonton, and was first described in well P.A. Pyrcz No. 1 by Imperial Oil Limited in 1950.

Lithology
The Winterburn Group is composed of silty dolomite, evaporite, argillaceous limestone, red and green siltstone, anhydrite, silty dolomite and siltstone. Pinnacle reefs develop in the Nisku Formation.

Hydrocarbon production

Oil is produced from the Nisku Formation in the Pembina oil field.

Distribution
In central Alberta it is 30 to 70m thick. It thins out over the Peace River Arch, and disappears in north-eastern British Columbia.

Subdivisions
The Winterburn Group is composed, from bottom to top, of the Nisku, Calmar and Graminia Formations. The Graminia Formation includes the carbonate Blue Ridge Member west of the Rimbey-Meadowbrook reef trend.

Relationship to other units

The Winterburn Group is conformably overlain by the Wabamun Group and overlays the Ireton Formation, except in the Peace River Arch, where it rests on the Precambrian basement.

It is correlated with the Birdbear Formation and part of the Three Forks Group in Saskatchewan, with the Southesk Formation and Alexo Formation in the Canadian Rockies and with the Redknife Formation and Kakisa Formation in north-eastern British Columbia.

References

Stratigraphy of Alberta
Devonian southern paleotropical deposits